Timothy Charles James is an Australian politician. He was elected to the New South Wales Legislative Assembly at the 2022 Willoughby state by-election.

In 2022, in his third preselection attempt to run for the Liberal Party, he was chosen as the candidate for the 2022 Willoughby state by-election, defeating popularly-elected local Mayor and member of the moderate faction Gail Giles-Gidney. He held the seat on 12 February 2022 despite a 19.2% swing to independent candidate Larissa Penn.

Professional and political life 

Born and raised in the northern Sydney suburb of Artarmon, James joined the Liberal Party in 1993. From 1996, he worked in the offices of Joe Hockey and then Prime Minister, John Howard while completing his law and economic studies at the University of Technology Sydney. 

Admitted as a solicitor to the Supreme Court of NSW in 2002, James worked as a commercial lawyer for Allens Arthur Robinson and then as a legal adviser to Pfizer Australia. 

He worked for Pfizer Australia, KPMG and Johnson & Johnson.  While undertaking secondments in New York and London, James completed a Master of Business Administration at the Australian Graduate School of Management. 

James worked as the Chief of Staff to Anthony Roberts who served as the NSW Minister for Fair Trading from 2011–2013 and then as Minister for Industry, Resources and Energy, and Special Minister of State.

From 2014–2015, James served as the Chief Executive Officer of Medicines Australia.

In 2017 he contested Liberal Party preselection for the 2017 North Shore by-election, losing to moderate Felicity Wilson. 

In 2018, James again unsuccessfully challenged now sitting MP Felicity Wilson for preselection for the seat of North Shore. He challenged the result in the NSW Supreme Court. James lost his legal challenge, with the court ruling against him.

He was previously the Executive General Manager of the Menzies Research Centre, a think tank associated with the Liberal Party.

Member for Willoughby
James was elected to Parliament at the 2022 Willoughby state by-election on 12 February 2022. 

In October 2022, he delivered a speech in the NSW Parliament stating his opposition to the Government's planned infrastructure program's of The Western Harbour Tunnel, The Warringah Freeway Upgrade and the Beaches Link Tunnel. The Beaches Link program was not funded in the 2022 NSW budget.

References

Living people
Liberal Party of Australia members of the Parliament of New South Wales
Members of the New South Wales Legislative Assembly
Year of birth missing (living people)
Place of birth missing (living people)
21st-century Australian politicians